Julie Gathoni Sumira Gichuru is a Kenyan businesswoman, entrepreneur and media personality with
investments in media, fashion retail and entertainment sectors. She is an independent director at Acumen Communication Limited and is a fellow and trustee of the Africa Leadership Initiative EA.

Education background 
Gichuru attended St Christophers School in Nairobi and at the age of eight and later Green Herald in Bangladesh. She came back to Kenya and joined Karen C school before transferring to Loreto Convent Msongari. In form two, she transferred from 8-4-4 system to a GCE boarding school and joined Imani School in Thika for Form 3 and 4. She holds an LLB Law and an MBA from Cardiff Law School University of Wales and Cardiff Business School University of Wales respectively

Career 
Julie Gichuru initially worked at Capital FM before moving to television as a reporter and news anchor at Kenya Television Network. She appeared in the Kenyan investigative TV series, The Inside Story on Kenya Television Network as well as various current affairs shows at NTV (Kenya) including political and current affairs programs Showdown, On the Spot, You The Jury and The People's Voice, and the news program Sunday Live and peace and reconciliation program Fist to Five at Citizen TV. Also included in this list is the post election peace specials Voices of Reason. Through ARIMUS Media Limited Gichuru now oversees the production of quality African content such as Africa Leadership Dialogues, the High School debate platform Great Debaters Contest, entertainment series Maisha and a pipeline TV production of the Fatuma's Voice social Forum. The Footprints Africa Foundation (FAF) was established by Anthony and Julie Gichuru.

Awards 
She is a recipient of Martin Luther King Salute to Greatness Award. Avance Media listed her as one of the 100 Most Influential African Women of 2019, and New African listed her as one of the 100 Most Influential Africans of 2017 and 2019. Besides she was recognized as the Young Global Leader by the World Economic Forum in 2010.

Personal life 
Gichuru is married to entrepreneur Anthony Gichuru. They have had 4 children.

References

External links 

Kenyan journalists
1974 births
Living people
People from Nairobi